Rita Gonzalez is an American curator, author and media artist. She is the head of the contemporary art department at Los Angeles County Museum of Art (LACMA), an institution she has worked at since 2004. Many of her curatorial projects involve under-recognized Latinx and Latin American artists.

Biography 
Gonzalez grew up in Whittier, California, studied at University of California, Santa Cruz (UCSC), University of California, San Diego (UCSD), and completed P.h.D. coursework in the University of California, Los Angeles (UCLA) film, television and digital media program on topics related to representation of Chicano art in contemporary art discourse. In 2018, Gonzalez participated in the Center for Curatorial Leadership program, with Anne Pasternak as her mentor at the Brooklyn Museum, and from 1997 to 1999 she served as the Lila Wallace Curatorial Fellow at the Museum of Contemporary Art San Diego.

Her curatorial oeuvre at LACMA includes Phantom Sightings: Art after the Chicano Movement (2008), Asco: Elite of the Obscure, A Retrospective, 1972–1987 (2011), L.A. Exuberance: New Gifts by Artists (2016), and A Universal History of Infamy (2018), a collaboration with José Luis Blondet and Pilar Tompkins Rivas.

References

External links 
Phantom Sightings: Art after the Chicano Movement - book/exhibition catalog authored by Rita Gonzalez, Howard Fox and Chon A. Noriega
Phantom Sightings: Art after the Chicano Movement - 2008 exhibition at LACMA

American art curators
American women curators
21st-century American writers
21st-century American artists
Living people
Year of birth missing (living people)
21st-century American women